These are lists of the tallest structures in Belgium, sorted by type.

Tallest skyscrapers
The vast majority of Belgium's skyscrapers are located in multi-municipal entity of the Brussels-Capital Region, which includes the City of Brussels, Saint-Josse-ten-Noode and Schaerbeek (territories around the Northern Quarter, the nation's largest cluster of high-rise buildings). The rest of the skyscrapers are scattered among Belgium's secondary cities.

Tallest radio and TV towers

Other buildings and structures

Gallery

References

External links
 Brussels Skyscraper Diagram at SkyscraperPage
 Air-traffic obstacle list

Belgium
Tallest buildings